Almalyk (Almalıq) is a rural locality (a village) in Buzovyazovsky Selsoviet, Karmaskalinsky District, Bashkortostan, Russia. The population was 236 as of 2010. There are 3 streets.

Geography 
Almalyk is located 33 km southwest of Karmaskaly (the district's administrative centre) by road. Buzovyazbash is the nearest rural locality.

References 

Rural localities in Karmaskalinsky District